James Edwin Ruthven Carpenter Jr. (January 7, 1867 – June 11, 1932) was the leading architect of luxury residential high-rise buildings in New York City in the early 1900s.

Biography
He studied at the University of Tennessee and at the Massachusetts Institute of Technology, from which he graduated in 1884. He then studied at the École des Beaux Arts in Paris.

Carpenter worked in Nashville, Tennessee, in 1888; in Norfolk, Virginia, in 1890; and later in New York City. In 1892, he published an architecture book, Artistic Homes for City and Suburb. When working in Virginia and partnered with John Kevan Peebles, he designed the Epworth Methodist Episcopal Church at Norfolk (1894-1896).  Working independently, he also designed Trinity United Methodist Church in Newport News, Virginia (1900).

Carpenter's first New York commission, in 1909, was for 116 East 58th Street, a nine-story apartment house, since demolished. His designs in Tennessee include the Columbia military arsenal (later the Columbia Military Academy), the Maury County courthouse in Columbia, Tennessee, the Kirkland Tower at Vanderbilt University, the Hermitage Hotel, Lynmeade Mansion and the Stahlman Building in Nashville, the Hurt Building in Atlanta, the American National Bank Building (Pensacola, Florida), and several noteworthy buildings in New York City, including 907 Fifth Avenue, 620 Park Avenue, 625 Park Avenue, 640 Park Avenue, 655 Park Avenue, 825 Fifth Avenue, 819 Park Avenue, 550 Park Avenue, completed in 1917, the neo-Italianate 1030 Fifth Avenue, built in 1925, and the Lincoln Building (42nd Street, Manhattan), completed in 1930.

One distinctive aspect of Mr. Carpenter's work is his pairing of buildings: sibling structures facing each other across a side street, like 1115 and 1120 Fifth, at 93rd Street; 1148 and 1150 Fifth, at 96th Street; and 1165 and 1170 Fifth, at 98th Street.

Carpenter's work was described in a New York Times ad in 1930 as having a "quiet, restful feeling about [his] apartments — in their large, high-ceiling rooms, the careful finish of detail, the skilled but unobtrusive service."

Personal life
On 9 February 1899 he married Marion Stires, who was born in December 1870 in Virginia or Georgia, a daughter of Van Rensselaer W. Stires and Letitia (née Milmore) Stires.  She died on October 24, 1956, in New York City, survived by a grandson and two great-grandchildren. She was an art collector.  J. E. R. Carpenter's death drew obituaries in the June 12, 1932 issue of the New York Times and the August 1932 issue of The Architectural Forum.

Bibliography
 Alpern, Andrew; Christopher Gray, preface. David Netto, foreword. The New York Apartment Houses of Rosario Candela and James Carpenter. New York: Acanthus Press, 2001.

References

American residential architects
1867 births
1932 deaths
Architects from Tennessee
Architects from New York City
People from Columbia, Tennessee
University of Tennessee alumni
Massachusetts Institute of Technology alumni
American alumni of the École des Beaux-Arts
People from the Upper East Side
19th-century American architects
20th-century American architects